Púxiān Wànnú was a Jurchen warlord who established the short-lived Eastern Xia dynasty in 13th-century China.

He originally served the waning Jin dynasty under pressure from the Mongol Empire. While the Mongols under Genghis Khan invaded Jin, a Khitan chief Yelü Liuge (耶律留哥) revolted against the dynasty in Liaodong in 1211 and made contact with the Mongol Empire in the next year. In 1214 Jin dispatched Puxian Wannu to Liaodong, but he was defeated around Kaiyuan. While Mukhali of the Mongol Empire invaded Northern China, Puxian Wannu rebelled against Jin and founded the Dazhen (大眞) kingdom in Dongjing (Liaoyang) in 1215. He adopted the title of Tianwang (天王 lit. Heavenly King) and named his era Tiantai (天泰).

As a result of an internal strife in the Eastern Liao, Yelü Liuge was expelled and sought support from Genghis. The Khitans got a counterattack from Jin and fled to Goryeo without permission. Puxian Wannu capitulated to Mukhali's army and sent his son Tege (铁哥/鐵哥 Tiěgē) as a hostage in 1216. However, he revolted soon after that and fled to an island while the Mongol army invaded Liaoxi and Liaodong.

In 1217 he moved from Dongjing to the Tumen River basin possibly to avoid both Mongol and Jin oppressions. He again named his kingdom Eastern Xia or Dongxia (东夏/東夏), established the capital around Yanji and called it Nanjing (南京 literally: "Southern Capital"). His domain extended north to Laoyeling Mountains, south to Hamgyŏngnamdo in modern-day North Korea, east to the Sea of Japan and west to the Zhangguangcailing Mountains, corresponding to the borderlands of modern-day China, Russia and North Korea.

He seems to have submitted to the Mongol Empire again. In 1218 the Mongol and Eastern Xia armies jointly intruded into Goryeo to subdue the Khitan remnants. Goryeo also joined the campaign and the Khitans were exterminated. The Mongol army retreated after establishing a "sibling" relationship with Goryeo. Mongol officers with Eastern Xia delegates came to Goryeo to exact tribute.

In 1222 Puxian Wannu revolted against the Mongol Empire yet again while Genghis Khan made an expedition toward the west. Since Goryeo rejected his demand for the opening of trading posts on the border, he invaded Goryeo many times. In 1233 Ögedei's son Güyük attacked Eastern Xia with a large force and captured Puxian Wannu. The Jin dynasty was overthrown in the next year.

References 
 The Cambridge History of China: Alien regimes and border states, 907-1368. p.257. The loss of Manchuria: Yeh-lu Liu-ko and P'u-hsien Wan-nu.
 William E. Henthorn, Korea: the Mongol invasions

Jurchen rulers
Warlords
13th-century Chinese monarchs
Founding monarchs